Megan Lynn is an American politician. She represents the 49th District in the Kansas House of Representatives. A member of the Republican Party, Lynn was first elected in 2018 and she is concurrently serving as the precinct committeewoman representing Olathe Ward 4 Precinct 18.

Early life
Megan Lynn (née Miller) was born in St. Paul, Minnesota, and raised in Amherst, Ohio. She attended Muskingum University where she received her bachelor's degree in political science and biology. She later obtained her master's degree in microbiology from Bowling Green State University. Lynn worked as a developmental biologist for eight years before she switched to a career in children's ministries.

Lynn is currently employed in children's ministries at the College Church of the Nazarene.

Kansas Legislature
During the 2019, 2020, and 2021 legislative sessions, Lynn sat on the Health and Human Services Committee, the Financial Institutions and Pensions Committee, and the Social Services Budget Committee. Lynn was appointed vice chair of the Social Services Budget Committee for the 2021 legislative session.

Election history

In 2018, Lynn won the primary election 88.95% to 11.05%, defeating Republican Fsehazion Desalegn. In the general election of that year, Lynn defeated Democrat Darnell Hunt 53.83% to 46.10%.In 2020 Lynn was challenged by Democrat Katie Dixon, and won the general election 51.02% to 48.88%.

Personal life 
Lynn married her husband, Chad, in 2003. Lynn and her husband currently reside in Olathe with their three children.

References 

Politicians from Olathe, Kansas
Women state legislators in Kansas
21st-century American politicians
Living people
Republican Party members of the Kansas House of Representatives
Year of birth missing (living people)
21st-century American women politicians
Muskingum University alumni
Bowling Green State University alumni